Naomi Hirahara (born 1962) is an American writer and journalist. She edited the largest Japanese-American daily newspaper, The Rafu Shimpo for several years. She is currently a writer of both fiction and non-fiction works and the Edgar Award-winning Mas Arai mystery series.

Biography
Naomi Hirahara was born in 1962 in Pasadena, California to Japanese parents, both of whom were survivors of the Hiroshima bombing. 
She began writing when she was in elementary school in Altadena, California. She received her bachelor's degree from Stanford University in international relations with a focus on Africa and spent a summer during her studies volunteering with the YWCA in Ghana, West Africa. After her 1983 graduation, she furthered her education at the Inter-University Center for Japanese Language Studies in Tokyo.

After a brief job as an editorial assistant, Hirahara began working at the Rafu Shimpo newspaper in 1984 as writer about the city of Los Angeles. Three years later, she began working at a boutique public relations firm to allow more time for creative writing and taking classes at the UCLA extension. After three years, she was asked to come back as an editor at the Rafu Shimpo and began writing nonfiction books in the 1990s. In 1996, Hirahara quit her job, took a fellowship for creative writing with the Milton Center at Newman University in Wichita, Kansas and committed to working full-time as a creative writer. In 2001, she published a non-fiction work, Green Makers: Japanese American Gardeners in Southern California and later that year published An American Son: The Story of George Aratani, Founder of Mikasa and Kenwood. In 2002, Distinguished Asian American Business Leaders was released.

She sold her first fiction book, Summer of the Big Bachi in 2003, which received positive reviews in the Chicago Tribune, and later that same year was named by them as one of the "10 best mysteries and thrillers of 2004".  It was also selected by Publishers Weekly as a "Best Books of 2004". The book turned out to be the first of a series about an ageing Japanese-American gardener, Mas Arai, a survivor of the atomic bomb, but the character was American-born. Though he has a degree, prejudice keeps him from other work, and he becomes a gardener, mirroring Hirahara's father's experience. Mas Arai became the featured character in Gasa Gasa Girl, Snakeskin Shamishen, Blood Hina and Strawberry Yellow.  (Strawberry Yellow takes place in Watsonville, Ca and at the Redman Hirahara Farmstead.) In 2007, the third book in her series, Snakeskin Shamishen won the Edgar Award from the Mystery Writers of America. The following year, the series began being released in Japan.

In 2014, Hirahara began a new series, though Mas Arai's story has at least two more chapters. The new series features a young bicycle policewoman, Ellie Rush, who is the central character in Hirahara's seventh novel, Murder on Bamboo Lane. While the Arai series focuses on California centered around the World War II generation, the Rush series is contemporary and expands on Hirahara's desire to speak from a woman's point of view. Her first book in which the main character was a woman was a juvenile fiction work, 1001 Cranes, published in 2008. Her most recent book in the Ellie Rush series, Grave on Grand Avenue (2015) has received positive reviews, and has been featured as a "Best Book" by Publishers Weekly.

Selected works

Mas Arai series

Ellie Rush series

Leilani Santiago series

Other fiction

South Central noir, Akashic Books 2022.

Non-fiction

Hirahara Naomi and Illi Ferandez. We Are Here : 30 Inspiring Asian Americans and Pacific Islanders Who Have Shaped the United States. First ed. Running Press Kids 2022.

References

External links
 LARB Radio Hour featuring Naomi Hirahara, Critical Theory, and Literary Hub Released: May 28 2015
 

1962 births
Living people
American writers of Japanese descent
Stanford University alumni
American women journalists
American women journalists of Asian descent
20th-century American women writers
21st-century American women writers
American women novelists
American novelists of Asian descent
21st-century American novelists
American mystery writers
Women mystery writers
Writers from Pasadena, California
American crime fiction writers
Women crime fiction writers
Journalists from California
Edgar Award winners
20th-century American non-fiction writers
21st-century American non-fiction writers
American women writers of Asian descent
20th-century American journalists